The 2018–19 Melbourne Renegades Women's season was the fourth in the team's history. Coached by Tim Coyle and captained by Amy Satterthwaite, they finished fourth in the regular season of WBBL04 and qualified for finals for the first time in the team's history.

In a "heartbreaking" and "thrilling" semi-final loss at Drummoyne Oval—notable for its "miracle" last-ball finish, resulting in the run out of Sophie Molineux and forcing a super over—the Renegades were knocked out of the tournament by the defending champions, the Sydney Sixers.

Squad
Each 2018–19 squad featured 15 active players, with an allowance of up to five marquee signings including a maximum of three from overseas. Under a new rule, Australian marquees were classed as players who held a national women's team contract at the time of signing on for their WBBL|04 team.

Personnel changes for the Renegades ahead of the season included:
England's Danielle Wyatt returned to the squad, having played in the first two seasons before missing WBBL|03.
Sri Lankan Chamari Atapattu was not re-signed for WBBL|04.
 Former Australian player Kris Britt retired at the end of WBBL|03.
Rhiann O'Donnell departed the team and joined the Hobart Hurricanes.
 Although a permanent resident in Australia, Hayley Jensen would no longer be classified as a local player due to earning re-selection for her native New Zealand during 2018. The Renegades chose not to sign her as an overseas marquee, therefore excluding her from the squad. She would go on to be contracted by the Perth Scorchers as a marquee replacement later in the season.

The table below lists the Renegades players and their key stats (including runs scored, batting strike rate, wickets taken, economy rate, catches and stumpings) for the season.

Ladder

Fixtures
All times are local time

Regular season

The Renegades recorded the second one-wicket victory in the league's history when Lea Tahuhu, a fast bowler not known for her batting ability, hit the winning single off leg spinning Stars captain Kristen Beams with just one ball to spare. Courtney Webb, on 21 not out, was the set batter at the non-striker's end.

Knockout phase

In the Renegades' first finals appearance, with three runs required off the last ball for an upset victory, Sophie Molineux was short of her ground attempting the winning run due to a "miracle" piece of team fielding by Sixers players Erin Burns, Sarah Aley and Alyssa Healy. In the resulting super over, Sixers captain Ellyse Perry hit a six off Molly Strano to eliminate the Renegades from the tournament. The match, in conjunction with the other semi-final played earlier in the day, was hailed as a showcase of "the irrefutable rise of women's cricket" and "sport with drama, skill and unpredictability – a potent recipe for success".

Statistics and awards
 Most runs: Danielle Wyatt – 368 (11th in the league)
 Highest score in an innings: Sophie Molineux – 78* (54) vs Melbourne Stars, 1 January
 Most wickets: Molly Strano – 19 (equal 5th in the league)
 Best bowling figures in an innings: Molly Strano – 4/21 (4 overs) vs Brisbane Heat, 16 December
 Most catches (fielder): Jess Duffin, Sophie Molineux – 7 (equal 9th in the league)
 Player of the Match awards:
 Sophie Molineux – 3
 Amy Satterthwaite – 2
 Molly Strano, Danielle Wyatt – 1 each
 Renegades Player of the Season: Sophie Molineux
 WBBL|04 Player of the Tournament: Sophie Molineux (equal 4th)
 WBBL|04 Team of the Tournament: Molly Strano, Sophie Molineux (twelfth man)
 WBBL|04 Young Gun Award: Georgia Wareham (winner)

References

2018–19 Women's Big Bash League season by team
Melbourne Renegades (WBBL)